The 2011 Internazionali Trismoka was a professional tennis tournament played on indoor hard courts. It was part of the 2011 ATP Challenger Tour. It took place in Bergamo, Italy between 7 and 13 February 2011.

ATP entrants

Seeds

 Rankings are as of January 31, 2011.

Other entrants
The following players received wildcards into the singles main draw:
  Laurynas Grigelis
  Dominik Hrbatý
  Joachim Johansson
  Andreas Seppi

The following players received a Special Exempt into the main draw:
  Marius Copil
  Dominik Meffert

The following players received entry from the qualifying draw:
  Farrukh Dustov
  Dušan Lajović
  Boris Pašanski
  Alexander Sadecky

Champions

Singles

 Andreas Seppi def.  Gilles Müller, 3–6, 6–3, 6–4

Doubles

 Frederik Nielsen /  Ken Skupski def.  Mikhail Elgin /  Alexander Kudryavtsev, walkover

External links

Internazionali Trismoka
Hard court tennis tournaments
2011